Pethia manipurensis is a species of cyprinid native to India where it is only known from Loktak Lake.  This species can reach a length of  SL.

References 

Pethia
Barbs (fish)
Fish described in 2000